Bernhard Ludwig Suphan (18 January 1845, in Nordhausen – 9 February 1911, in Weimar) was a German philologist, known for his historical-critical edition of the complete works of Johann Gottfried Herder (33 volumes).

He studied classical and German philology at the universities of Halle and Berlin, and from 1868 worked as a gymnasium teacher in Berlin. In 1887 he was appointed director of the Goethe Archives in Weimar (from 1889 onward, known as the Goethe-Schiller Archives).

Selected works 
 Herders sämmtliche Werke, (33 volumes, 1877–1913; with Otto Hoffmann, Reinhold Steig and others) – Herder's collected works.
 Friedrichs des Grossen Schrift über die Deutsche Litterature, (1888) – Frederick the Great's writings on German literature.
 Friedrich Rückert; Vortrag gehalten in Weimar am 16.Mai 1888, (1888) – On Friedrich Rückert; a lecture held in Weimar on 16 May 1888.
 Xenien 1796. Nach den Handschriften des Goethe- und Schiller- Archivs, (with Erich Schmidt, 1893) – Xenien 1796: according to manuscripts of the Goethe-Schiller archives. 
 Fritz Reuter und Klaus Groth im Goethe- und Schiller-Archiv, (1906) – On Fritz Reuter and Klaus Groth in the Goethe-Schiller archives.

References 

1845 births
1911 deaths
People from Nordhausen, Thuringia
Humboldt University of Berlin alumni
University of Halle alumni
Germanists
German philologists
German archivists
1911 suicides
Privy Councillor (Russian Empire)
Suicides in Germany